Ibrahim Div-Keïta (born 18 January 1996 in Vernon) is a French footballer who currently plays as a forward for League of Ireland First Division side Galway United.

Career

In 2015, Keita left English club Wolverhampton Wanderers.

In 2017, he signed for Irish side Finn Harps after playing for VSS Košice in Slovakia and Greek teams AEL and Doxa Proskinites.

In 2018, he signed for FK Olympia Prague in the Czech Republic.

Career statistics

Club

Notes

References

External links
 

1996 births
Living people
French footballers
Association football forwards
Évreux FC 27 players
Wolverhampton Wanderers F.C. players
FC VSS Košice players
Athlitiki Enosi Larissa F.C. players
Finn Harps F.C. players
1. FK Příbram players
Bohemians 1905 players
Galway United F.C. players
League of Ireland players
Czech National Football League players
Czech First League players
France youth international footballers
French expatriate footballers
French expatriate sportspeople in England
French expatriate sportspeople in Slovakia
French expatriate sportspeople in Greece
French expatriate sportspeople in Ireland
French expatriate sportspeople in the Czech Republic
Expatriate footballers in England
Expatriate footballers in Slovakia
Expatriate footballers in Greece
Expatriate association footballers in the Republic of Ireland
Expatriate footballers in the Czech Republic
Bohemian Football League players